San Antonio is a district of the León Cortés Castro canton, in the San José province of Costa Rica.

History 
San Antonio was created on 7 November 1995 by Decreto Ejecutivo 24769-G .

Geography 
San Antonio has an area of  km² and an elevation of  metres.

Locations 
 Poblados (villages): Angostura (part), Cuesta

Demographics 

For the 2011 census, San Antonio had a population of  inhabitants.

Transportation

Road transportation 
The district is covered by the following road routes:
 National Route 226
 National Route 336

References 

Districts of San José Province
Populated places in San José Province